Virtasalmi is a former municipality of Finland. On January 1, 2004, it was joined to the new municipality of Pieksänmaa with Jäppilä and Pieksämäen maalaiskunta.

Pieksämäki
Populated places disestablished in 2004
Former municipalities of Finland